Who's Your Daddy Now? is a 2007 Philippine television situational comedy series broadcast by GMA Network. Starring Joey Marquez, Raymart Santiago and Ynna Asistio, it premiered on April 16, 2007 on the network's KiliTV line up replacing Lagot Ka, Isusumbong Kita. The series concluded on July 13, 2007.

Cast and characters
Lead cast
 Joey Marquez as Peter
 Raymart Santiago as Mario
 Ynna Asistio as Andrea
 Paolo Contis as Paul

Supporting cast
 Celia Rodriguez as Candy
 Jean Garcia as Stephanie
 Julia Lopez as Diding

Accolades

References

External links
 

2007 Philippine television series debuts
2007 Philippine television series endings
Filipino-language television shows
GMA Network original programming
Philippine comedy television series
Philippine television sitcoms